Charles William Molyneux, 3rd Earl of Sefton (10 July 1796 – 2 August 1855), styled Lord Molyneux (or Viscount Molyneux until 1838), was a British Whig politician.

Background
Sefton was the eldest son of William Molyneux, 2nd Earl of Sefton, and the Hon. Maria Margaret, daughter of William Craven, 6th Baron Craven.

Political career
Sefton was returned to Parliament for Lancashire South in 1832, a seat he held until 1835. In 1838 he succeeded his father in the earldom and took his seat in the House of Lords. Between 1851 and 1855 he served as Lord Lieutenant of Lancashire.

Family
Lord Sefton married Mary Augusta, daughter of Robert Gregg-Hopwood, in 1834. They had several children. He died in August 1855, aged 59, and was succeeded by his eldest son, William.

The family seats were: Croxteth Hall, Lancashire ; Stoke Farm, now called Sefton Park in Stoke Poges, Buckinghamshire; and Sefton House (later known as Seaford House) in Belgrave Square, London.

References

External links

 

1796 births
1855 deaths
Lord-Lieutenants of Lancashire
Molyneux, Charles Molyneux, Viscount
Molyneux, Charles Molyneux, Viscount
Sefton, E3
Whig (British political party) MPs
Earls of Sefton
Historic Society of Lancashire and Cheshire